Blood and guts may refer to:
 AEW Blood and Guts, a 2021 professional wrestling event by All Elite Wrestling (AEW)
 Blood and Guts match
 Blood and Guts, an album by jazz pianist Mal Waldron
 Blood and Guts (film), a 1978 Canadian sports drama 
 Blood & Guts, an early title for the 2006 horror spoof Stupid Teenagers Must Die!
 Blood & Guts, a 2014 non-fiction book about modern whaling 
 Old Blood and Guts, a nickname for George S. Patton
 Blood and Guts, an autobiography by bodybuilder Dorian Yates

See also
 Africa Blood and Guts, a 1966 Italian film also known as Africa Addio